Dirk Philips (1504–1568) was an early Anabaptist writer and theologian.  He was one of the peaceful disciples of Melchior Hoffman and later joined Menno Simons in laying out practical doctrines for what would become the Mennonite church.

Biography 

Dirk Philips was born in Leeuwarden in 1504, the son of a priest (it was not uncommon at the time for a priest to have unofficial wives and families).  He was a Franciscan friar.  He joined the Anabaptist Brotherhood in 1533 and became an elder in 1534.  In 1537, he was named one of the outstanding Anabaptist leaders.  In 1561, he was described as an old man, not very tall, with a grey beard and white hair.  He died in Het Falder in 1568.

Beliefs 

He was the leading theologian of his time among Dutch Mennonites.  He was known to be very systematic in his thinking, and very strict and unwavering in his beliefs.  There were two key themes to his theology: the word of scripture, and the word incarnate in Jesus.  Like other Anabaptists, he gave Christ pre-eminence. He was not as charming or friendly as Menno Simons.

He identifies seven ordinances of the church:
Pure doctrine
Scriptural use of the sacraments
Washing the feet of the saints
Separation (the ban and shunning)
Command of love
Obedience to the command of Christ
Suffering and persecution

He believed in strict adherence to the ban or shunning.  This is when open sinners are expelled from the church until they repent.  He felt this was necessary in order to maintain the purity of the church.  His emphasis on the ban and the purity of the community makes Dirk Philips' writings more popular with the Old Order Amish.  He believed in the absolute opposition between the church and the world, and therefore that believers should expect persecution.

See also
 Enchiridion of Dietrich Philips

References

External links
 Philips: The Sending of Preachers or Teachers - essay by Dirk Philips on Anabaptist evangelism
 Dirk Philips (1504-1568) in Global Anabaptist Mennonite Encyclopedia Online

1504 births
1568 deaths
Dutch Protestant theologians
People from Leeuwarden
Dutch Anabaptists
Dutch Mennonites
Dutch Christian pacifists
16th-century Protestant theologians
16th-century Anabaptist ministers